Ugia sundana is a species of moth in the family Erebidae. It is found in Indonesia (Java, Sumatra, Borneo) and in Thailand. The habitat consists of lowland forests.

The ground colour of the wings is medium reddish brown in males. Females are more ochreous.

References

Moths described in 1924
Ugia
Moths of Indonesia
Moths of Asia